Abdul Khadre Daffé (born 16 June 1962) is a Senegalese judoka. He competed in the men's half-heavyweight event at the 1984 Summer Olympics.

References

External links
 

1962 births
Living people
Senegalese male judoka
Olympic judoka of Senegal
Judoka at the 1984 Summer Olympics
Place of birth missing (living people)